The Women's 800 metre freestyle competition of the swimming events at the 2015 World Aquatics Championships was held on 7 August with the heats and 8 August with the final.

Records
Prior to the championships, the existing world and championship records were as follows.

During the competition, prior to this 800 metre event, on 4 August 2015, Katie Ledecky set a new championship record in the 1500 metre freestyle final; her 800-meter mark was at 8:13.25.

Legend: † – en route to final mark

Results

Heats
The heats were held at 11:17

Final
The final was held on 8 August at 18:55.

References

Women's 800 metre freestyle
2015 in women's swimming